Celsinho may refer to:

 Celsinho (footballer, born 1950), Celso Ferreira, Brazilian football forward
 Celsinho (footballer, born March 1988), Brazilian footballer who plays as a defender
 Celsinho (footballer, born August 1988), Brazilian footballer who plays as a midfielder
 Celsinho (footballer, born 1996), Portuguese footballer who plays as a defender